Alexander Mahé Owens Drysdale  (born 19 November 1978) is a retired New Zealand rower. Drysdale is a two-time Olympic champion and a five-time world champion in the single sculls. He is a seven-time New Zealand national champion and five-time recipient of New Zealand Sportsman of the Year.

Early life and background
Born in Australia to New Zealand parents, the name Mahé comes from the largest island in the Seychelles. He attended Tauranga Boys' College in Tauranga, New Zealand, then the University of Auckland where he took up rowing at the age of 18. He initially gave up rowing to concentrate on his studies, but began again after watching fellow New Zealander Rob Waddell win gold at the 2000 Olympic Games. Drysdale rowed from West End Rowing Club in Avondale, Auckland, New Zealand, and is also a member of the Tideway Scullers School, London.

World Championships
Drysdale first represented for New Zealand at the Rowing World Cup III in 2002, in the New Zealand coxless four. After the 2004 Olympic Games, where his New Zealand crew finished fifth in the final, Drysdale switched to the single scull. He won his first World Championship title at the 2005 World Rowing Championships at Gifu, Japan, despite having broken two vertebrae in a crash with a water skier earlier in the year.

He successfully defended his title in 2006 at Dorney Lake, Eton, England, in 2007 at Munich, Germany, and again in 2009 in Poznań, Poland, holding off Britain's Alan Campbell and the Czech Republic's Ondřej Synek. At the 2009 World Rowing Championships he beat his own world best time in the single and reduced it to 6:33.35. As of 2021 that time stands as the best time at a World Rowing Championship  but it was beaten in 2017 by his countryman Robbie Manson for the new men's single scull world record.

Olympic Games
At his first Olympic Games, in 2004, Drysdale was part of the New Zealand coxless four team that finished fifth.

Drysdale was officially selected as New Zealand's Olympic heavyweight sculler for the Beijing Olympics on 7 March 2008. He was also chosen to carry the flag for New Zealand during the parade of nations in the opening ceremony.
Unfortunately for Drysdale, a severe gastrointestinal infection in the week before his final saw him off form and he was only able to win the bronze medal in the men's single scull. The gold and silver medals went to Olaf Tufte from Norway and Ondřej Synek from the Czech Republic, respectively. Clearly suffering from his illness, after his race Drysdale was carried by life raft and then moved to a waiting ambulance. He was also seen vomiting. He was, however, able to stand to be awarded his medal.

At the 2012 Summer Olympics Drysdale won the gold medal in the men's single sculls, despite throwing up the morning of race day due to nervousness. He has since been dethroned, and had to settle with silver in the world championships leading up to the 2016 Olympics, each time bested by the Czech Ondřej Synek, who won the WC in 2010, 2013, 2014 and 2015.

At the 2016 Summer Olympics, Drysdale successfully defended his Olympic men's single sculls title, taking the gold medal over Croatia's Damir Martin. The race was decided by a photo finish, with Drysdale edging out Martin by half a bow ball. In November 2016, Drysdale announced that he would take a break from rowing in 2017. He returned to the New Zealand squad at the end of 2017 with a view of competing at the 2020 Tokyo Olympics.

After losing out to Jordan Parry in selection for the single scull at the rearranged 2020 Tokyo Olympics, Drysdale announced his retirement from international rowing in June 2021.

New Zealand national championships
Drysdale won the gold medal six times in single sculls at the New Zealand national championships through 2010. In 2011, he won the silver medal in single sculls at the New Zealand National Rowing Championships at Lake Ruataniwha in Twizel, losing to Nathan Cohen by two lengths. He reclaimed the national title in 2012, where Cohen took second. He did not compete in 2013.

Awards
Drysdale has won the Sportsman of the Year award at the Halberg Awards on five occasions (2006, 2007, 2009, 2012, and 2016). He is the only New Zealander to have won the award more than three times. In 2006 he also won the Halberg Supreme Prize.

He won the University of Auckland Young Alumnus of the Year Award in 2007, and was awarded Member of the New Zealand Order of Merit for services to rowing in the 2009 New Year Honours.

Canoe polo
Drysdale has also represented New Zealand in canoe polo as a junior. He represented NZ in an under-18 team that toured to Fiji. Later he was a NZ under-21 representative that toured to Tonga. In 1999–2000 he was executive of NZ Canoe Polo.

Personal life
Drysdale married fellow rower and Olympic bronze medallist Juliette Haigh in September 2013. They have one daughter, born in October 2014.

Drysdale is cousin to Rose Keddell, a member of the New Zealand women's hockey team. His younger brother, Peter, is a cricketer.

References

External links

 
 
 
 
 

|-

|-

|-

1978 births
New Zealand male rowers
Rowers at the 2004 Summer Olympics
Rowers at the 2008 Summer Olympics
Rowers at the 2012 Summer Olympics
Rowers at the 2016 Summer Olympics
Medalists at the 2008 Summer Olympics
Medalists at the 2012 Summer Olympics
Medalists at the 2016 Summer Olympics
Olympic gold medalists for New Zealand in rowing
Olympic bronze medalists for New Zealand
People educated at Tauranga Boys' College
University of Auckland alumni
Members of the New Zealand Order of Merit
Rowers from Melbourne
Sportspeople from Tauranga
Living people
World Rowing Championships medalists for New Zealand